Ceolwald of Wessex was a member of the House of Wessex (see House of Wessex family tree). Although a member of the direct male line from Cynric to Egbert, Ceolwald was never king. His birth and death dates are unknown.

His father was Cuthwulf and his child Cenred of Wessex. Nothing more of him is known for certain.  Some sites  list him as married to  Fafertach (620–644), daughter of Prince Finguine of Mumhan (603–644).  Several  list him as son of Princess Gwynhafar of Dumnonia (daughter of King Clemen ap Bledric).

References

External links 
 

7th-century English people
House of Wessex